This is a list of airlines currently operating in Malta.

Scheduled airlines

Charter airlines

See also
 List of defunct airlines of Malta
 List of airlines
 List of defunct airlines of Europe

References

Malta
Airlines
Airlines
Malta